

Plants

Archosauromorphs

Dinosaurs
Data courtesy of George Olshevsky's dinosaur genera list.

Plesiosaurs

New taxa

Synapsids

References

1950s in paleontology
Paleontology
Paleontology 2